Dębowiec Sports Arena (known in Poland as Hala Widowiskowo-Sportowa w Bielsku-Białej) is an indoor arena that is located in Bielsko-Biała, Poland. It is the home of the professional Polish Women's-Volleyball League club Aluprof Bielsko-Biała. The arena opened on September 2, 2010, and it has a seating capacity of 4,500.

Indoor arenas in Poland
Sport in Bielsko-Biała
Buildings and structures in Bielsko-Biała
Sports venues in Silesian Voivodeship